The Future Democratic Party was a pro-Lee Jae-myung political party in South Korea.

History 
On January 23, 2020, former Democratic Party of Korea member; Chun Se-kyung left the Democratic Party of Korea and announced his will to create a new party. The party was officially founded on March 11, 2020 and officially registered with the National Election Commission on March 16, 2020. The party is made of mostly pro-Lee Jae-myung politicians; however, Lee Jae-myung himself has nothing to do with the party nor explicitly stated his support for the party. The party ran two candidates for proportional representation in the 2020 South Korean legislative election.

After the 2020 legislative elections, the Party dissolved itself.

See also 
 Politics of South Korea
 New Deal liberalism

References

2020 establishments in South Korea
2020 disestablishments in South Korea
Populist parties
Left-wing populism
Defunct political parties in South Korea
Democratic parties in South Korea
Political parties established in 2020
Political parties disestablished in 2020
Social liberal parties